Swing Rueda is a swing dance in the round (wheel) that features someone calling Lindy Hop moves and the dancers moving in unison. It was adapted from Salsa Rueda by Elaine Hewlett and Jeff Miller at The Rhythm Room Dance Studio, Dallas, Texas in 2000.

The Dance 
 Always maintain the integrity of the circle
 Leaders in general, always rotate through the center of the circle
 Follows end swing outs and many moves by facing the center of the circle
 Leaders are responsible for getting to the next partner on time

Swing Rueda Calls (abbreviated)
Open Break
Swing Out - done by default, not usually called
Dame (1,2,3)
Inside Turn
Outside Turn
Reverse Turn
Circle
Texas Tommy (Stop Texas)
Coca-Cola
Dame con Dos (clap “& 8”)
Mini Dip (1.5 Circle)
Sushi Roll
Boing Boing
Circle into Charleston
Tortilla (Amoeba)
Right Foot/Left Foot Stomp
Tostada
Tostada Dame
Followers/Leaders Turn In
Followers/Leaders Stay In
Tranke
Boogie Forward
Boogie Back
Shorty George
Slow Motion
Mess Around
Freeze
Itch
Traffic Jam (NYC calls*)
Dawn Hampton (NYC)
Turnstyle (NYC)
Smear the Bagel (NYC call for Tortilla/Amoeba)
Toasted Bagel (NYC)
Plain Bagel (NYC)
 These are a few of the calls from the NYC swing rueda team exhibition at the 2003 San Francisco Swing Dance Festival

History 
In 2000, after extensive studying of Salsa in Miami, Jeff Miller and Elaine Hewlett began teaching the famed 1950's Cuban dance, Salsa Rueda in Dallas, Texas. Rueda is danced in a circle with two or more couples. There is a dancer who calls the moves which the entire circle executes in unison. Some moves require partner changes and that's when the fun begins.

Using the Cuban original as a template, Jeff and Elaine created Swing Rueda. In the early 2000s they taught Swing Rueda at multiple dance events in Texas and across the US including Swingout New Hampshire and the Oakland Swing Dance Festival. Since its creation it has been spread around the globe, with reports of it traveling to Canada, Europe and Singapore.

See also
SwingRueda FB
Swing Rueda Dance playlist on YouTube
Swing Rueda Basic Lessons YouTube
Balboa Rueda Dance playlist on YouTube
Swingrueda.com
Lindy Hop
Dance move

References 

Lindy Hop